The dipole repeller is a center of effective repulsion in the large-scale flow of galaxies in the neighborhood of the Milky Way, first detected in 2017.
It is thought to represent a large supervoid, the Dipole Repeller Void.

The dipole repeller is directly opposed to the Shapley Attractor, an over-density of galaxies located in the Shapley Supercluster. The dipole repeller's apparent repulsion is due to matter in the vicinity being pulled towards the Shapley Attractor, along with the Great Attractor. Due to this, the dipole repeller has likely become devoid of matter, causing an apparent repulsion on galaxies between the repeller and the Shapley Attractor.

Discovery 

There is also a pattern of bulk flow in the motion of neighboring galaxies extending to distances of over 250 megaparsecs (Mpc). There is a known overdensity – the Shapley Supercluster – creating an attraction in the flow of galaxies.

The repeller appears to be located at a distance of about 220 Mpc and is anticipated to coincide with a void in galaxy density.

That single center of attraction along with a roughly equal single repeller appear to be the most significant contributors to the CMB dipole.

The authors of the article published in Nature Astronomy in January 2017 argue that the distance velocity measurements of the Dipole Repeller . No single observed concentration of matter (gravitationally attractive) can explain the observed velocities and directions of distance from stars and galaxies. We can therefore observe the presence of an additional force, repulsive and whose nature is not specified, according to these authors.

One of the authors, Hoffman, told The Guardian:

Hoffman also told Wired: 

Hoffman told IFLScience: 

The CNRS shared the same position and stated in a press release:

The same research team identified in September 2017 a second void with repulsive force: the Cold Spot Repeller.

These voids, which repel by the inverse gravitational force, are among main components of the cosmic "V-Web".

Controversy about the Dipole Repeller and its 'repulsive force' 
Nevertheless, the discovery of the Dipole Repeller was commented on by astrophysicists and journalists in the mainstream media without using repulsive force . This is the case of Peter Coles, author of the blog "In the dark", Ethan Siegel in an article published by Forbes, as well as in an article published by Ars Technica.

This is because gravitation is an attractive force, but if there is an underdense region it apparently acts as a gravitational repeller, based on the concept that there may be less attraction in the direction of the underdensity, and the greater attraction due to the higher density in other directions acts to pull objects away from the underdensity; in other words, the apparent repulsion is not an active force, but due simply to the lack of a force counteracting the attraction.

See also

References

External links
  The Dipole Repeller  Film produced as part of the publication: "The Dipole Repeller" by Yehuda Hoffman, Daniel Pomarède, R. Brent Tully, and Hélène Courtois, Nature Astronomy 1, 0036 (2017).

Shapley Supercluster